Frederick Drandua (12 August 1943 –  1 September 2016) was a Ugandan Roman Catholic priest, who served as the Bishop of the Roman Catholic Diocese of Arua, in Uganda, from 27 May 1986 until 19 August 2009.

Background and priesthood
Drandua was born in Ulippe, in present-day Arua District, in the West Nile sub-region, in the  Northern Region of Uganda, on 12 August 1943. He was ordained priest on 9 August 1970. He served as priest of the Roman Catholic Diocese of Arua until 27 May 1986.

As bishop
He was appointed bishop by Pope John Paul II on 27 May 1986 and was consecrated as Bishop of Arua on 15 August 1986, by Cardinal Emmanuel Kiwanuka Nsubuga†, Archbishop of Kampala, assisted by Emmanuel Wamala, Bishop of Kiyinda-Mityana and Bishop Cesare Asili†, Bishop of Lira, Uganda.

Bishop Frederick Drandua resigned as Bishop of Arua on 19 August 2009, due to poor health. He died on 1 September 2016, at St. Francis Hospital Nsambya, in Nsambya, Kampala, Uganda, at the age of 73 years.

See also
 Catholic Church in Uganda
 Uganda Martyrs

Succession table

References

External links
 Diocese of Arua, Uganda
 Pope Mourns Bishop Drandua

1943 births
2016 deaths
20th-century Roman Catholic bishops in Uganda
21st-century Roman Catholic bishops in Uganda
People from Maracha District
Roman Catholic bishops of Arua